John Harpsfield (1516–1578) was an English Catholic controversialist and humanist.

Life
Harpsfield was educated in Winchester College and New College, Oxford (BA 1537, MA in theology 1541).  He was perpetual fellow of New College from 1534 until 1551 and was appointed the first Regius Professor of Greek (Oxford) (approximately 1541-1545).  He became Vicar of Berkeley, Gloucestershire in 1550, Archdeacon of London in 1554, and Dean of Norwich in 1558.

He was a champion of papal authority and a leader of the Marian Persecutions.  He interrogated John Bradford, who was put to death under the revived Heresy Acts in 1555.  He assisted Edmund Bonner in the questioning of Thomas Cranmer and preached on the occasion of Cranmer's disgradation (14 February 1556).

After the accession of Elizabeth I in 1558, Harpsfield was deposed as archdeacon and dean in 1559.  At some point between 1559 and 1562, he was committed to Fleet Prison, together with his brother Nicholas Harpsfield, for his refusal to swear the Oath of Supremacy.  He wrote letters of appeal to Lord Burghley and Sir Thomas Smith in Greek, as a fellow humanist, and was released on health grounds in 1574.  He continued to be called before the Star Chamber and was placed in the custody of the Bishop of Lincoln.

Works
 Latin translation of Simplicius' commentary on Aristotle's Categories
 Greek translation of Virgil, Aeneid, Book 1
 Several published sermons, including nine of the thirteen in Edmund Bonner's Homilies (1555):  these homilies were translated into Cornish by John Tregear, and as the Tregear Homilies, have become a classic work of Cornish literature; and A Notable and Learned Sermon made upon Saint Andrewes Day (1556)  
Versus elegiaci, ex centuriis summatim comprehensi, de Historia Ecclesiastica Anglorum
Chronicon Johannis Harpesfeldi a diluvio ad annum 1559

Sources
William Wizeman, "Harpsfield, John (1516–1578)," Oxford Dictionary of National Biography, Oxford University Press, 2004

1516 births
1578 deaths
Clergy from London
People educated at Winchester College
Alumni of New College, Oxford
Fellows of New College, Oxford
Archdeacons of London
Deans of Norwich
16th-century English Roman Catholic priests
Regius Professors of Greek (University of Oxford)